Claude de Lorraine, Duke of Guise (20 October 1496 – 12 April 1550) was a French aristocrat and general. He became the first Duke of Guise in 1528.

He was a highly effective general for the French crown.  His children and grandchildren were to lead the Catholic party in the French Wars of Religion.

Biography
Claude was born at the Château de Condé-sur-Moselle, the second son of René II, Duke of Lorraine, and Philippa of Guelders. He was educated at the French court of Francis I. On 9 June 1513, at the age of sixteen, Claude married Antoinette de Bourbon (1493–1583), daughter of François, Count of Vendôme.

Military service
Claude distinguished himself at the Battle of Marignano (1515), and was long in recovering from the twenty-two wounds he received in the battle. In 1521, he fought at Fuenterrabia, and Louise of Savoy ascribed the capture of the place to his efforts. In 1522 he forced the English to raise the siege of Hesdin. In 1523, he became governor of Champagne and Burgundy, after defeating at Neufchâteau the imperial troops who had invaded this province. In 1525, Claude defeated a peasant army near Saverne (Zabern). Following Francis I's return from captivity, Claude was made Duke of Guise in 1527. The Guises, as cadets of the sovereign House of Lorraine and descendants of the Capetian House of Anjou, claimed precedence over the Bourbon princes of Condé and Conti.

Marriage and issue
Claude married Antoinette de Bourbon, daughter of François, Count of Vendôme and Marie de Luxembourg, on 9 June 1513; they had:

 Mary of Guise (1515–1560); married firstly Louis II d'Orléans, Duke of Longueville and secondly king James V of Scotland and had issue, including Mary, Queen of Scots
 Francis, Duke of Guise (1519–1563)
 Louise of Guise (10 January 1520, Bar-le-Duc – 18 October 1542); married Charles I, Duke of Arschot on 20 February 1541.
 Renée of Guise (2 September 1522 – 3 April 1602), Abbess of St. Pierre, Reims
 Charles of Guise (1524–1574), Duke of Chevreuse, Archbishop of Reims, and Cardinal of Lorraine.
 Claude, Duke of Aumale (1526–1573)
 Louis I, Cardinal of Guise (1527–1578)
 Philip of Guise (3 September 1529, Joinville – 24 September 1529, Joinville)
 Peter of Guise (b. 3 April 1530, Joinville); died young.
 Antoinette of Guise (31 August 1531, Joinville – 6 March 1561, Joinville), Abbess of Faremoutiers
 François de Lorraine, Grand Prior (18 April 1534, Joinville – 6 March 1563)
 René, Marquis of Elbeuf (1536–1566)

By an unnamed mistress, Claude had:
son

Death
Claude fell ill in 1550, and despite being under the care of five doctors, died on 12 April.

Ancestry

See also
Duke of Lorraine
Dukes of Lorraine family tree

Notes

References
45

|-

|-

1496 births
1550 deaths
People from Meurthe-et-Moselle
Military leaders of the Italian Wars
101
Marquesses of Elbeuf
Counts of Aumale
Counts of Guise
Claude
15th-century French people
16th-century French people
Grand Huntsmen of France
Claude
Claude